Parvin Darabi (born 1941, Tehran) is an Iranian-born American activist, writer and defender of women’s rights.

Background
Darabi studied at California State University Northridge, University of Southern California and Pepperdine University, and California Coast University. Parvin worked as an electronic systems engineer, program manager, company president, and engineering consultant until 1994. From 1985 to 1990 she owned and operated her own Company PT Enterprises, in Mountain View, California where they developed the most sensitive Radar Detector presently on the German Naval Vessels active in NATO.

Her elder sister, Homa Darabi, committed suicide in 1994 by burning herself in Tajrish square in Tehran to protest against the Iranian government.  Since then, Parvin has become an activist. She wrote the book Rage Against the Veil and speaking out against Iran's regime and Islam.

She also established the Homa Darabi foundation, her intention was to secular state, to democracy to gender equality.

Parvin along with Lydia Sparksworthy co-authored a book "Women of Truckee Making History" which chronicles the lives of 30 influential women in Truckee, California.

Views on Shia Islam
Darabi has said that there are many laws in Shi'a Islam that would turn off any educated person completely, one of them being temporary marriage, which she terms as "religiously sanctioned prostitution." Darabi has said that the only thing the Islamic Republic of Iran brought was poverty and misery.

Works

Rage Against the Veil 
Rage Against the Veil is a book about Parvin's sister, Homa Darabi, who on February 21, 1994 committed suicide.

Women of Truckee Making History 
Women of Truckee Making History is a book that celebrates local women for their contributions to the community of Truckee, California. It was compiled, designed and edited by two Truckee women, Parvin Darabi and Lydia Sparksworthy.

The book was published in 2002 by the Homa Darabi Foundation, a non-profit organisation dedicated to human rights issues mostly related to women.

The book details the lives of 30 influential women in Truckee. The criteria for selecting the 30 women required applicants to live or work full-time in Truckee, and “to be actively involved in voluntarism which required dedication above and beyond normal eight-to-five, 40-hours-a week paid employment.”

See also
List of former Muslims
Criticism of Islam
List of famous Persian women

References

External links
Dr. Homa Darabi Foundation
Self-Immolation in Tajrish Square, Tehran - OnTheIssues.com, the Progressive Woman's Quarterly
Open letter to Ms. Amanpour: "Iranian Women better off today?" Are they?

1941 births
Critics of Shia Islam
Iranian emigrants to the United States
Living people
Iranian activists
Iranian former Shia Muslims